Myrianthus arboreus, the giant yellow mulberry or monkey fruit,  is a dioecious tropical tree in the genus Myrianthus. It lives in the tropical Central African countries of Central African Republic, Gabon, Cameroon, Nigeria, and Tanzania. Its chromosome count is 2n = 28.

Uses
The leaves of the M. arboreus are eaten in vegetable soup and used as livestock feed.

References

External links
 
 

arboreus
urticaceae